Maria Elena Kyriakou (born 11 January 1984) is a Greek-Cypriot singer best known for winning the first season of The Voice of Greece under the mentorship of Despina Vandi. She represented Greece in the Eurovision Song Contest 2015 with her song "One Last Breath".

Biography and career

Early life 

Maria Elena Kyriakou was born on 11 January 1984 in Larnaca, Cyprus and has lived there since then. She has three siblings; one brother Kyriacos Pavlou and two sisters. At the age of 13, her mother registered her at a music school. Years later, she studied philosophy at the University of Ioannina and during the first year she got a proposition from Giannis Ploutarchos which she did not accept as she preferred to concentrate on her studying. After 2 years at the University of Ioannina she decided to move back to her home country. She then continued her studies at the University of Cyprus. After her graduation she opened her own tutorial class. In 2011, her mother applied for Maria Elena to audition for Greek Idol but did not go to the auditions.

2014: The Voice of Greece 
Kyriakou auditioned for The Voice of Greece at the age of twenty-nine. Appearing on the third of the eight blind auditions, she auditioned with "Because of You" originally by Kelly Clarkson—with all four coaches electing for her to join their teams; from which Kyriakou selected Despina Vandi. During the battles, she performed "Hero" against Eva Kanata–with Despina crowning her as the winner. In the second live show, she performed "I Have Nothing" and was saved by the public. In the third live show, she performed "Den Eisai Edo" and was once again saved by the public along with Stelios Mayalios. In the fourth live show, she performed "Hurt" and was saved by the public to proceed to the semi-final. In the semi-final, she performed "Bleeding Love" for her solo performance and "Listen" for her duet with Mando. Kyriakou proceeded to the final after getting 60 points from her coach and 80 points from the public. Her song "Dio Egoismoi" was available on iTunes the day after the semi-final, on 3 May 2014. In the final she performed her original song "Dio Egoismoi" and a duet with her coach with the song "No More Tears (Enough Is Enough)". As she advanced to the second round along with Kosmidou and Kintatos, she performed "Because of You", the song she performed during the blind auditions. Kyriakou won the series and a record deal with Minos EMI.

2015: Eurovision Song Contest 
Maria Elena Kyriakou won the Greek national final and represented Greece in the Eurovision Song Contest 2015 in Vienna, Austria.

Personal life 
Kyriakou is one of the four children in her family among them the known Cypriot footballer Kyriacos Pavlou. In 2006, she married Cypriot sports journalist Gregoris Gregoriou, with whom she has three children; Kyriakou and Gregoriou divorced in 2011.

Discography

Studio albums

Singles 

Autumn 2015 Horis Esena (Without You) for the show with which it shares the same name.

Featured in
2015: "The Otherside" (Tamar Kaprelian featuring Elhaida Dani, Elina Born, Maria-Elena Kyriakou & Stephanie Topalian)

Television

Awards

References

External links 

1984 births
Living people
21st-century Cypriot women singers
Greece
People from Larnaca District
Eurovision Song Contest entrants for Greece
Eurovision Song Contest entrants of 2015
Greek Cypriot people
Minos EMI artists
University of Cyprus alumni
Modern Greek-language singers